The Somogyvár Abbey (Szent Egyed Abbey) was a Benedictine monastery established at Somogyvár in the Kingdom of Hungary in 1091. It was dedicated to Saint Giles.

A legal formulary book was compiled there in the second half of the 15th century.

References

Sources

External links 

 Aerial photographs of the ruins of Somogyvár Abbey and the castle

Benedictine monasteries in Hungary
1091 establishments in Europe
11th-century establishments in Hungary
Ruins in Hungary